Leavitt is an Anglo-Norman surname variant or surname and may refer to:

Abby Fisher Leavitt (1836–1897), American social reformer
Rev. Ashley Day Leavitt (1877–1959), American Congregational minister
Rev. Bradford Leavitt (born 1868), pastor of San Francisco's First Unitarian Church
Benson Leavitt (1797–1869), American businessman
Caroline Leavitt (born 1952), American novelist
Charles Wellford Leavitt (1871–1928), American landscape architect, urban planner, and civil engineer
Dallin Leavitt (born 1994), American football player
Daniel Leavitt (1801–1851), American inventor
David Leavitt (born 1961), American writer
David Leavitt (1791–1879), New York City banker and financier
Dudley Leavitt (1830–1908), Mormon pioneer
Rev. Dudley Leavitt (1720–1762), New Hampshire Congregational minister
Dudley Leavitt (publisher) (1772–1851), American publisher
Edward Chalmers Leavitt (1842–1904), early New England painter
Elisha Leavitt (1714–1790), Hingham, Massachusetts landowner
Emily Wilder Leavitt (1836–1921), American historian and genealogist
Erasmus Darwin Leavitt, Jr. (1836–1916), mechanical engineer
Frank McDowell Leavitt (1856–1928), American engineer and inventor
Frank Simmons Leavitt (1891–1953), American wrestler known as Man Mountain Dean
George Ayres Leavitt (1822–1888), publisher
Capt. George Baker Leavitt, Sr. (1860–1925), American mariner
Harold J. Leavitt (1922–2007), American psychologist of management
Hart Leavitt (1808–1881), American landowner, legislator and prominent abolitionist
Hart Day Leavitt (1909–2008), American teacher and amateur jazz musician
Henrietta Swan Leavitt (1868–1921), American astronomer
Hiram Leavitt (1824–1901), American settler, innkeeper and judge
Humphrey H. Leavitt (1796–1873), American congressman and U.S. District Court Judge
Jeannie Leavitt (born 1967), United States Air Force officer
Jim Leavitt (born 1956), University of South Florida football coach
John Leavitt (1608–1691), American tailor, public officeholder, and founding deacon of Old Ship Church
John Leavitt (Ohio settler) (1755–1815), early Ohio settler in the Western Reserve
John Faunce Leavitt (1905–1974), shipbuilder, writer, painter and museum curator
John Hooker Leavitt (1831–1906), American banker and start senator
John McDowell Leavitt (1824–1909), American lawyer, Episcopal clergyman, poet, novelist, editor and professor
John Wheeler Leavitt (1790–1870), American businessman
Rev. Jonathan Leavitt (minister) (1731–1802), American Congregational minister
Jonathan Leavitt (1764–1830), American attorney, judge, state senator and businessman
Jonathan Leavitt (publisher) (c. 1797 – 1851), American bookbinder and publisher
Joseph Leavitt (born 1754) American soldier and quaker
Rev. Joshua Leavitt (1794–1873), American Congregationalist minister
Dr. Josiah Leavitt (1744–1804), American physician and inventor
Judith Walzer Leavitt (born 1940), University of Wisconsin–Madison professor of history of medicine
L. Brooks Leavitt (1878–1941), American investment banker and antiquarian book collector
Laurence G. Leavitt (1903–2000), American headmaster
Lewis Leavitt, American medical director and professor of pediatrics
Martine Leavitt, Canadian-American author for young adults 
Mary Greenleaf Clement Leavitt (1830–1912), American temperance educator and orator 
Michael O. Leavitt (born 1951), American politician
Michael Leavitt (artist) (born 1977), American sculptor, painter and educator
Moses Leavitt (1650–1730), American surveyor, selectman, Deputy and Moderator of the General Court
Myron E. Leavitt (1930–2004), American politician
Norman Leavitt (1913–2005), American film and television actor
Ralph Leavitt (born 1877), American automobile dealer and fugitive
Bud Leavitt Jr. (1917–1994), executive sports editor for The Bangor Daily News
Raphy Leavitt (born 1948), Puerto Rican composer
Robert Leavitt (1883–1954), American Olympic athlete
Robert Greenleaf Leavitt (1865–1942), American botanist
Robert Keith Leavitt (1895–1967), American copywriter and author
Col. Roger Hooker Leavitt (1805–1885), American abolitionist and operator of Underground Railroad station
Ron Leavitt (1947–2008), American television writer and producer
Lieut. Samuel Leavitt (1641–1707), early settler, deputy and member of New Hampshire House of Representatives
Scott Leavitt (1879–1966), American Forest Service ranger, Spanish–American War veteran and member of the U.S. House of Representatives
Sturgis Elleno Leavitt (1888–1976), graduate, Bowdoin College, Harvard, author, Professor of Spanish, University of North Carolina
Thaddeus Leavitt (1750–1826), American merchant, inventor and patentee of Western Reserve lands
Thomas Leavitt (banker) (1795–1850), Canadian banker, businessman and diplomat
Thomas Leavitt (inventor) (1827–1899), American inventor
Thomas Leavitt (settler) (ca. 1615–1696), English puritan and settler of New Hampshire
Thomas Rowell Leavitt (1834–1891), Canadian sheriff, Mormon and early settler of Leavitt, Alberta
William Homer Leavitt (1868–1951), American portrait painter

See also 
 Levett
 Levitt

Further reading
 Noyes, Emily Leavitt. (1941). Leavitt: The descendants of John, the Immigrant Through His Son Moses
 Noyes, Emily Leavitt. (1948). Leavitt: The descendants of John, the Immigrant Through His Son Israel
 Noyes, Emily Leavitt. (1949). Leavitt: The descendants of John, The Immigrant Through His Son Josiah
 Noyes, Emily Leavitt. (1956). Leavitt: The descendants of John, The Immigrant Through His Son Samuel
 Noyes, Emily Leavitt, Berndt, Julia Bumpus (1982). Leavitt: The descendants of John, The Immigrant Through His Son Nehemiah 
 Noyes, Emily Leavitt. (1953). Leavitt: Descendants of Thomas Leavitt, the Immigrant (1616–1696), and Isabella Bland
 Leavitt, Brooks Russell. (2002). Leavitt and allied families: For the descendants of V. Russell Leavitt (1891–1946) and Harriet Edna Rice Leavitt (1892–1970), privately printed

References

Surnames of Norman origin
English-language surnames
French-language surnames